The Mazda HR-X was the first hydrogen powered concept car produced by Mazda. The car was unveiled at the Tokyo Motor Show in 1991. It was the first in a series of demonstration hydrogen internal combustion engine vehicles produced by Mazda.

Design and development

The Mazda HR-X was a small concept car developed by Mazda a their plant in Aki District, Hiroshima to showcase the use of hydrogen fuel as a possible environmentally friendly alternative for automotive transport. The cabin accommodated four people who entered via gull-wing doors. It was constructed of plastic and designed to be nearly completely recyclable.

The car was powered by a two rotor Wankel engine that produced  mounted in the rear. The Wankel engine was chosen as it solved the backfiring problems that beset previous attempts to run hydrogen in combustion engines.  37 Nm3 of hydrogen was stored in a metal hydride tank that was refuelled by a single nozzle alongside water for cooling. The engine was connected to the wheels via a 4 speed automatic transmission, while a KERS-like system called Active Torque Control System (ACTS) was used to recover braking energy and reuse it to improve acceleration.

Legacy
A single example of the HR-X was displayed at the Tokyo Motor Show in 1991 and then in New York in 1992. However, it was not ready for production and no more were produced. The car was superseded by the more conventional HR-X 2 a year later, the next in line of a number of Wankel-powered hydrogen-fuelled vehicles developed by Mazda. The lineage culminated in the RX-8 Hydrogen RE and Premacy Hydrogen RE Hybrid produced in small quantities in 2007.

See also
List of Mazda vehicles
List of hydrogen internal combustion engine vehicles

References

Citations

Bibliography

External links
Image gallery at favcars.com

Cars introduced in 1991
Hydrogen cars
HR-X